Captain Robin Rathmore Plunket, 8th Baron Plunket (3 December 1925 – 16 November 2013), was a descendant of prominent Irish lawyer and Whig politician William Conyngham Plunket for whom the Peerage of the United Kingdom (not of Ireland) was created in 1827.

Plunket was christened on 1 February 1926 at St Saviour's Church, Walton Street, London. His godmother was his parents' friend, the Duchess of York (later Queen Elizabeth The Queen Mother), who was represented on this occasion by Mabell Ogilvy, Countess of Airlie. He was the second son of Terence Conyngham Plunket, 6th Baron Plunket of Newton and his wife, the former Dorothé Mabel Lewis. Lord and Lady Plunket were killed in an aircraft crash in 1938, and their three sons (Robin Rathmore Plunket, Patrick Terence William Span Plunket, and Shaun Albert Frederick Sheridan Plunket) were brought up by their father's sister, the Hon. Helen Rhodes.

Education
Robin Rathmore Plunket was educated at Eton College and served in the Army.

Personal life
He married Jennifer Southwell, daughter of Bailey Southwell and his wife, the former Erica Alberta Barry, on 8 November 1951. The Plunkets, who did not have children, lived in London. Lady Plunket died in 2018.

Robin Rathmore Plunket became 8th Baron in 1975 on the death of his elder brother. He sat in the House of Lords on various occasions.

Legacy
On his death, the title passed to his nephew, Tyrone Shaun Terence Plunket (b. 1966), only son of Lord Plunket's youngest brother, the Hon. Shaun Albert Frederick Sheridan Plunket (1931—2012).

See also
 List of hereditary Baronies in the Peerage of the United Kingdom

References

External links
 Profile at thepeerage.com
 Profile, cracroftspeerage.co.uk

1925 births
2013 deaths
People educated at Eton College
Barons in the Peerage of the United Kingdom
Younger sons of barons
Rifle Brigade officers
Place of birth missing
Place of death missing

Plunket